Lysolaje may refer to the following places:

Łysołaje, a village in Lublin Voivodeship, Poland
Łysołaje-Kolonia, a village in Lublin Voivodeship, Poland
Lysolaje (Prague), a cadastral district of Prague, Czech Republic